was a Japanese photographer.

Sonobe is born in Tsukuda, Tokyo.

He died on 3 March 1996, aged 75.

References

Japanese photographers
1921 births
1996 deaths